Letart is an unincorporated community in Mason County, West Virginia, United States. It is located on the Ohio River.

Letart is part of the Point Pleasant, WV–OH Micropolitan Statistical Area.

The community was named after one Mr. LeTart, a local pioneer settler.

References

Unincorporated communities in Mason County, West Virginia
Unincorporated communities in West Virginia
Point Pleasant micropolitan area
West Virginia populated places on the Ohio River